McPhie is a surname. Notable people with the surname include:

Heather McPhie (born 1984), American skier
James McPhie (1894–1918), Scottish World War I Victoria Cross recipient
Jim McPhie (1920–2002), Scottish footballer and manager
Leland McPhie (1914–2015), American athlete
Mad Dog McPhie (born 1971), English professional wrestler
Sandy McPhie (1929–2015), Australian politician